is a Japanese footballer currently playing as a defender for Iwate Grulla Morioka, on loan from Cerezo Osaka.

Career statistics

Club
.

Notes

References

External links

2001 births
Living people
Sportspeople from Osaka Prefecture
Association football people from Osaka Prefecture
Japanese footballers
Japan youth international footballers
Association football defenders
J3 League players
Cerezo Osaka players
Cerezo Osaka U-23 players
Iwate Grulla Morioka players